Malift Air was an airline based in Kinshasa, Democratic Republic of the Congo. It operated domestic passenger and cargo services from 1995 until 2009. Its main base was N'Dolo Airport, Kinshasa.

The airline was added to the List of air carriers banned in the European Union on March 22, 2006 but was removed again following the end of its operations on November 22, 2009.

History
The airline started operations in 1995 and was formerly known as Malila Airlift and ended operations in 2009.

Accidents and incidents
4 October 2007 - An Antonov An-26 cargo plane crashed into a busy market in the Congolese capital Kinshasa shortly after takeoff, killing 51 people.
18 July 2007 - An Antonov An-24 shortly after taking off from Bandundu Airport had an engine failure, lost altitude and crashed 8 km from Bandundu. Of the 2 crew and 8 passengers aboard, all survived.

Fleet 
, the Malift Air fleet is stored and inactive in Kinshasa. The fleet included:

1 – Antonov An-28
1 – Antonov An-32
1 – Britten-Norman BN-2 Islander

In 2003, an An-24RV bearing Malila livery and registration number EW-46498 was photographed stored at Minsk.  It was still there in May 2005, but by that time it was missing its starboard propeller

See also		
 Transport in the Democratic Republic of the Congo

References

Defunct airlines of the Democratic Republic of the Congo
1995 establishments in Zaire
Airlines established in 1995
2009 disestablishments in the Democratic Republic of the Congo
Airlines established in 2009
Companies based in Kinshasa